Allerød station is a railway station serving the town of Lillerød in Allerød municipality north of Copenhagen, Denmark. It is located on the Hillerød radial of Copenhagen's S-train network. Originally it was named Lillerød, but the name was changed in 1952 to prevent confusion with nearby Hillerød. The station is served by A trains.

See also
 List of railway stations in Denmark

References

External links

 

S-train (Copenhagen) stations
Allerød Municipality
Railway stations opened in 1864
Buildings and structures in the Capital Region of Denmark
Buildings and structures in Allerød Municipality
Railway stations in Denmark opened in the 20th century